The 2017 Atlantic Coast Conference women's basketball tournament was a postseason women's basketball tournament for the Atlantic Coast Conference was held March 1 to 5 in Conway, South Carolina, at the HTC Center. It was originally scheduled to be played in Greensboro, North Carolina, but was moved due to HB2 law. Notre Dame won their 4th straight ACC tournament title to earn an automatic trip to the NCAA women's tournament.

Seeding
Tournament seeds are determined by teams' regular season conference record with tiebreakers determined by ACC tiebreaking rules.

Schedule

Bracket

Awards and honors

See also

 2017 ACC men's basketball tournament

References

2016–17 Atlantic Coast Conference women's basketball season
ACC women's basketball tournament
College basketball tournaments in South Carolina
Conway, South Carolina
Women's sports in South Carolina